Justice Springer may refer to:

 Charles E. Springer, justice of the Supreme Court of Nevada
 William McKendree Springer, chief justice of the United States Court of Appeals of Indian Territory